Don't Wait Up is a British sitcom that was broadcast for six series from 1983 to 1990 on BBC1. It  starred Nigel Havers, Tony Britton and Dinah Sheridan, and was written by George Layton. It was directed and produced by Harold Snoad, who also directed and produced another sitcom, Keeping Up Appearances. The series was adapted in part from an earlier, unbroadcast Comedy Playhouse by Layton

Don't Wait Up was repeated on Comedy Central Extra and in 2003, Playback released the first two series on DVD.

Plot
Don't Wait Up starts as Tom Latimer splits from his wife Helen. At the same time, his father Toby, also a doctor, announces his intention to divorce his wife of 32 years, Angela. Father and son then move in together and frequently argue about politics and medical practices, Toby being more of a 'Harley Street' type and well to the right of the more liberally-inclined Tom. The latter tries to get his parents back together, while beginning a romance with Toby's secretary Madeleine Forbes, whom he later marries.

Cast
Tony Britton as Dr Toby Latimer
Nigel Havers as Dr Tom Latimer
Dinah Sheridan as Angela Latimer
Jane How as Helen Kramer (previously Latimer)
Susan Skipper as Madeleine Latimer (née Forbes)
Richard Heffer as Dr Charles Cartwright (series 1 and 2)
Simon Williams as Dr Charles Cartwright (from series 3)
Tricia George as Susan Cartwright
Jane Booker as Felicity Spicer-Gibbs
Timothy Bateson as Mr Burton (series 1 and 2)
Joan Ryan as Lady Greshott
Timothy Bateson as Mr Burton
Directed and Produced by Harold Snoad

Episodes

Home releases 

The first two series were released in a boxset in 2003 by Playback. No further series have been released.

Acorn Media re-released the first two series in June 2012.

References
Mark Lewisohn, "Radio Times Guide to TV Comedy", BBC Worldwide Ltd, 2003
British TV Comedy Guide for Don't Wait Up

External links
 Don't Wait Up at the BBC Comedy Guide
 

1983 British television series debuts
1990 British television series endings
1980s British sitcoms
1990s British sitcoms
BBC television sitcoms
English-language television shows